Dhoon Glen Halt (Manx: Stadd Ghlion y Dhoon) is an intermediate stopping place on the northern section of the Manx Electric Railway in the Isle of Man. It is not to be confused with Dhoon Halt, which is the next halt, about 600 metres to the north.

Location
The stop lies on the A2, at the southern end of the parish of Maughold. It is at the top of the Dhoon Glen, one of the island's National Glens. This is a steep wooded glen which runs west to east for about 1 km and leads to a secluded pebble beach. The halt is on a bend in both the road and the railway (both following the contour of the land), and has its own tiny cafe which has been there for many years, latterly known as "Jean's Place" among other titles, it is currently called the "Dhoon Coffee Stop".

Dhoon Glen Hotel
There is a large unsurfaced car park opposite the halt, on the site of the Dhoon Glen Hotel which was destroyed by fire in 1917 and never rebuilt. The old station shelter, separate from the cafe (which houses passenger toilet facilities beneath it) was replaced in 1987 with a more modern structure, and now forms a passenger shelter in addition to being covered accommodation for the cafe as required.

Renovation
The area was renovated in 2008 and the station platform area block paved to rail level, creating a clearly demarcated passenger/customer area.

Route

See also
 Manx Electric Railway stations

References

Sources

 Manx Electric Railway Stopping Places (2002) Manx Electric Railway Society
 Island Images: Manx Electric Railway Pages (2003) Jon Wornham
 Official Tourist Department Page (2009) Isle Of Man Heritage Railways

Railway stations in the Isle of Man
Manx Electric Railway
Railway stations opened in 1899